Eid Al-Fayez (Arabic: عيد الفايز),(born 1945) is a Jordanian politician.

Personal information
Al-Fayez was born in 1945 in Manja, Jordan. He is descended from a Bedouin tribe in Jordan called Bani Sakhr. In 1969 he received a bachelor's degree in Economics from Beirut Arab University (BAU). From then until 1983 he worked in the private sector in America. In 1983 he started working in the public sector and has held various government positions such as Minister of Labour, Minister of State, Minister of Youth and Sports, and Minister of Interior which he held for several years after the 2005 Amman bombings. He is a widower and has three children.

Medals and decorations
Jordan Globe Grand Cordon-First Degree (Arabic: وسام الكوكب الاردني من الدرجة الأولى), is considered one of the most prestigious Medals and Decorations in Jordan. Jordan Globe Grand Cordon is awarded by the King to individuals who distinguish themselves by their exceptional service to Jordan.
United Nations Civil Defense Medal
Grand First Degree Medal of the Lebanese Ministry of Interior

Work experience
Chairman of the Board of Trustees at Al-Zaytoonah University of Jordan 2011-(current)
Chairman of the Supreme Council of Civil Defence
Chairman of the Social Security Corporation
Chairman of the Vocational Training Corporation
Chairman of the Union of Arab Ports
President of the Arab Academy for Maritime Transport - Sharjah
President of the board of directors at United Company for Organizing Land Transport
President of Al-Badia Charity Organization
Vice-President of Aqaba Region Authority
Member of the board of directors at Arathe b Union of Land Transport
Member of the Governing Council at the Syrian-Jordanian Company for traffic
Member of the board of directors at National Shipping Lines
Member of the Board of Free Zones
Member of the board of directors at the Aqaba port Corporation
Member of the board of directors at the Iraqi-Jordanian Land Transport Company
Member of the board of directors at the Royal Club Research
Member of the Technical Committee of the Supreme Chemical Industries
Member of the Five-Year Plan Committee for the transport sector
Member of the  Jordan Olympic Committee
Member of the Executive Committee of Jordanian Association for Boy Scouts and Girl Guides
Member of the Greater Amman Municipality
Member of the Supreme Committee for the development of the Southern Region
Member of the Board of Trustees at the University of Jordan
Member of the Board of Trustees at Al-Zaytoonah University of Jordan

References

External links 
 Jordan Prime Ministry website
 WikiLeaks: cablegate, cable 2007-11-26 (07AMMAN4693) BIOGRAPHIES FOR JORDAN'S NEW GOVERNMENT

Living people
1945 births
Eid
Academic staff of the University of Jordan
Academic staff of Al-Zaytoonah University of Jordan
Government ministers of Jordan
Labor ministers of Jordan
Sports ministers of Jordan
State ministers of Jordan
Interior ministers of Jordan
Beirut Arab University alumni